Richard Carew may refer to:
 Richard Carew (antiquary) (1555–1620), English translator and antiquary
 Sir Richard Carew, 1st Baronet (c. 1580–1643), medical experimenter and educationist, son of the antiquary

See also
 Sir Richard Carew Pole, 13th Baronet (born 1938)
Carew (surname)